Product binning is the categorizing of finished products based on their characteristics. Any mining, harvesting, or manufacturing process will yield products spanning a range of quality and desirability in the marketplace. Binning allows differing quality products to be priced appropriately for various uses and markets.

Economic and legal theory

Product binning and grading allows a degree of price discrimination which may be easier to defend legally, since it can be based on real or perceived differences in product quality.

In order to undergo binning, manufactured products require testing, usually performed by machines in bulk. Binning allows large variances in performance to be condensed into a smaller number of marketed designations. This ensures coherency in the marketplace, with tiers of performance clearly delineated. The immediate result of this practice is that, for legal and reputational reasons, products sold under a certain designation must meet that designation at a minimum. Individual products may still exceed advertised performance. Different bins may even be assigned different model numbers and prices .

Agriculture

An everyday example of product binning occurs with agricultural products, such as fruits, nuts, and vegetables. The yield from a harvest may vary considerably in quality, from near-inedible to ideal photographic appearance. The produce is sorted into quality categories which may be based on nutrition and safety, but also often have criteria that are based on cosmetic appearance. The best quality items may be classified into categories such as "Choice" or "Grade A", and are sold at a premium price for table presentation and consumption.

Items that are less visually appealing or damaged may be binned for incorporation into frozen, dried, canned, or otherwise-processed foods. Consumers rarely see these lesser categories for sale in a raw, unprocessed condition.

Foods of even lower quality may be processed into pet food or animal feed, or composted into fertilizer.

Clothing and fashion

Gemstones

Semiconductor manufacturing

Background
Semiconductor manufacturing is an imprecise process, sometimes achieving as low as 30% yield. Defects in manufacturing are not always fatal, and in many cases it is possible to salvage part of a failed batch of integrated circuits by modifying performance characteristics. For example, by reducing the clock frequency or disabling non-critical parts that are defective, the parts can be sold at a lower price, fulfilling the needs of lower-end market segments.

This practice occurs throughout the semiconductor industry on products such as CPUs, RAM, and GPUs, SSDs.

In 2020, when Apple launched their new Apple silicon M1 chip, they offered parts with 8 GPU cores as well as 7 GPU cores, a result of binning parts that had shortcomings.

In 2021, when Apple launched their new Apple silicon A15 Bionic chip, they similarly gave a 5-core GPU to the iPhone 13 Pro and iPad mini 6 and a (binned) 4-core GPU to the iPhone 13.

Speed bump
A speed bump, in computer terms, is a slight increase in frequency (e.g., from 1.8 to 1.9 GHz) or a slight increase in functionality (e.g. Intel Core i7-8700K to i7-8086K). Some time after the initial release of a product, manufacturers may choose to increase the clock frequency of an integrated circuit for a variety of reasons, ranging from improved yields to more conservative speed ratings (e.g., actual power consumption lower than TDP). These models are binned as different product chipsets, which places the product into separate virtual bins in which manufacturers can designate them into lower-end chipsets with different performance characteristics.

Testing
Finished products enter a machine that can test hundreds of pieces at a time, taking only a few hours to complete. Each piece can be tested to determine its highest stable clock frequency and accompanying voltage and temperature while running.

Overclocking and core unlocking

Overclocking
Overclocking is the increase of clock speed beyond the manufacturer's maximum rated clockspeed. Since manufacturers are only required to meet the minimum advertised specifications, the potential for overclocking of a product is not typically tested during the binning process. Therefore, it should not be assumed that higher-rated products will overclock better than lower-rated ones.

The resulting variation in upper-limit overclocking potential between otherwise identical pieces of hardware results in what is known as the "silicon lottery" by computer hobbyists, where the peak stable clock speeds (typically of a CPU or GPU) are unknown until being tested after purchasing.

Core unlocking
Similar to frequency binning, products may also be binned based upon the number of cores which are enabled. As with overclocking, some chips may have more cores than marketed. It may be possible for the end user to enable these cores.

References

External links 
 Philips Lumileds LUXEON Application Brief: an example of a documented binning structure

Semiconductor device fabrication
Production and manufacturing